George David Cummins (December 11, 1822 – June 26, 1876) was an American Anglican Bishop and founder of the Reformed Episcopal Church.

Life and career
He was born in Delaware on December 11, 1822.  Cummins graduated from Dickinson College, located in Carlisle, Pennsylvania, in 1841, and entered the Methodist ministry.

In 1845, he took orders in the Protestant Episcopal Church.  After serving as rector of Episcopal parishes in Virginia, Washington, and Chicago, Cummins was appointed Assistant Bishop of Kentucky in 1866.

A staunch Evangelical of Reformed doctrine, Cummins opposed the influences of Ritualism and the Anglo-Catholic Oxford Movement. In 1873, he was criticized for receiving communion with ministers outside of the Protestant Episcopal Church and resigned his position. He then founded the Reformed Episcopal Church, of which he was the first presiding bishop, in New York City.

Doctrine
Cummins' Evangelical theological persuasions led him to separate from the Episcopal Church, which had, in his mind, been poisoned by the ritualism of the Anglo-Catholic party. Before he left the Episcopal Church, Cummins as bishop engaged in a highly provocative Church service in which he presided alongside a Presbyterian clergyman, Dr. John Hall, over Holy Communion at Hall's Fifth Avenue Presbyterian Church.

Cummins believed that if the pure Evangelical principles of the Reformation were to survive the sacramental and ecclessial theological complications and gaudy ornamentation of the Anglo-Catholic movement, Evangelicals of all denominations must unite. He sought "Evangelical Catholicity" based on the ideas of the "Muhlenberg Memorial," authored by the prestigious Evangelical Episcopalian, William Augustus Muhlenberg. "Strength to the Protestant cause," declared Muhlenberg, "is one of the objects of this movement [i.e., the Muhlenberg Memorial]." Those, "who are true to the Reformation standards" needed to present "a united phalanx against Rome," Muhlenberg explained. Cummins embodied this charge. And when he could no longer in good conscience serve the Diocese of Kentucky due to Ritualistic advances, he left the Episcopal Church.

Bishop Cummins left the Episcopal Church due to conflict with Anglo-Catholic theology, one facet of which is the insistence on Apostolical Succession for valid ordinations. Cummins felt that such a high view of Episcopacy injured the objectives of the new Re-formed Episcopal Church, which, now formed, sought to provide a unified Evangelical haven for all Reformational Christians in the spirit of "Evangelical catholicity". Ironically, Cummins, who preached against a high view of Apostolic Succession, was unwilling to part with it. When he left the Episcopal Church, and before he was deposed, he rushed to consecrate another bishop, the somewhat controversial Charles Edward Cheney, as the second bishop of the Re-formed Episcopal Church. Thereafter, the Reformed Episcopal Church's orders remained as apostolically valid as any of the Anglo-Catholics. They retained a high practice, despite a low view.

Death
Cummins died in Lutherville, Maryland, on June 26, 1876.

See also

 Bishop Cummins Reformed Episcopal Church
 List of Dickinson College alumni
 List of founders of religious traditions
 List of people from Chicago
 List of people from Delaware
 List of people from Kentucky
 List of people from New York City
 List of people from Virginia
 List of people from Washington, D.C.

References

Publications
 Alexandrine Macomb Cummins (Mrs. G.D. Cummins). Memoir of George David Cummins (New York, 1878).
 Historical material by and about Cummins from Project Canterbury
 
 Allen C. Guelzo, For the Union of Evangelical Christendom: The Irony of the Reformed Episcopalians (Penn State Press, 2010)

1822 births
1876 deaths
19th-century Anglican bishops in the United States
19th-century Methodist ministers
American Episcopal priests
American founders
American Methodist clergy
Clergy from New York City
Dickinson College alumni
Founders of new religious movements
People from Chicago
Bishops in Delaware
People from Lutherville, Maryland
Religious leaders from Virginia
Religious leaders from Washington, D.C.
Presiding Bishops of the Reformed Episcopal Church
Religious leaders from Kentucky
19th-century Anglican theologians